Nathan Craig Rickard is an Australian former freestyle swimmer.

Rickard, elder brother of swimmer Brenton, was the World Student Games 50 metre freestyle gold medalist in 1997, setting an Australian record of 22.50s in the process. He upset world record holder Michael Klim to win the 50 metre freestyle at the 1997 Australian Swimming Championships. This qualified him for the 1998 World Championships in Perth, where he placed 12th in the 50 metre freestyle and swam heats on the silver medal-winning  relay team. He won the national 50 metre freestyle title again in 1998 and came fourth in that event at the Kuala Lumpur Commonwealth Games later that year. In 1999 he was fifth in the 50 metre freestyle at the Pan Pacific Swimming Championships.

References

External links

Year of birth missing (living people)
Living people
Australian male freestyle swimmers
Universiade gold medalists for Australia
Universiade medalists in swimming
Medalists at the 1997 Summer Universiade
World Aquatics Championships medalists in swimming
Commonwealth Games competitors for Australia
Swimmers at the 1998 Commonwealth Games